Edward Ross Roybal (February 10, 1916 – October 24, 2005) was a member of the Los Angeles City Council for thirteen years and of the U.S. House of Representatives for thirty years.

Biography

Roybal was born on February 10, 1916, into a Mexican family that traced its roots in Albuquerque, New Mexico back hundreds of years, to the Roybals who settled the area before the founding of Santa Fe. In 1922, a railroad strike prevented his father from being able to work, and Roybal, age 6, was brought with his family to the East Los Angeles neighborhood of Boyle Heights, where he graduated from Roosevelt High School in 1934. After graduation, Roybal joined the Civilian Conservation Corps. After serving in the CCC, Roybal studied business at UCLA and law at Southwestern Law School.

He served a stint in the Army, where he worked as an accountant for an infantry unit.

On January 8, 2001, he was presented with the Presidential Citizens Medal by President Bill Clinton.

Roybal died of respiratory failure complicated by pneumonia at the age of 89 on October 24, 2005, at Huntington Hospital in Pasadena. He was survived by his wife, Lucille, and children Lucille Roybal-Allard, Lillian Roybal-Rose and Edward Roybal Jr. A funeral service was held at the Cathedral of Our Lady of the Angels, and burial was at Calvary Cemetery, East Los Angeles.

Public service

Community

In 1942, Roybal began work as a public health educator with the California Tuberculosis Association. Upon returning home, he began work as director of health education for the Los Angeles County Tuberculosis and Health Association, a position he held until 1949. In 1949, Roybal teamed with local organizer Fred Ross and Anthony "Tony" P Rios from a group of people who had supported his earlier campaign to form the Community Service Organization (CSO), which tied together a variety of religious, political, and organized labor groups to fight local discrimination. The organization, which organized get-out-the-vote drives, did not explicitly endorse candidates, but Roybal's presence as president of the organization and the personal endorsements of many of its members helped form a groundswell of support that contributed to Roybal's victory.  In 1960 Roybal helped organize the Mexican American Political Association (MAPA) and served as its first president from 1960 to 1962.

After retiring from Congress, Roybal founded the Lucille and Edward R. Roybal Foundation, which awards scholarships to Latino students pursuing careers in the field of health. Edward R. Roybal lived the rest of his life in Pasadena, California as one of the deans of local and national politics, endorsing several candidates in elections throughout the region.

City Council

Elections

In 1947 Roybal ran to fill the Los Angeles City Council District 9 seat held by Parley Parker Christensen. The district, which included Boyle Heights, Bunker Hill, Civic Center, Chinatown, Little Tokyo, and the Central Avenue corridor, was then 45% White, 34% Latino, 15% African American, and 6% "other" residents. Roybal placed third in a field of five. In 1949, though, he defeated Christensen in the runoff election, for a two-year term. He was reelected in every vote thereafter until leaving office in 1962 after 13 years, He was president pro tempore in his last term.

Positions

Roybal was noted as "often the spokesman for minority groups" in the City  Council and "recognized leader of East Side minority groups." He was also seen as a "consistent supporter" of subsidized low-cost public housing.

Other positions taken:

Communists, 1950. Roybal cast the sole negative vote against an ordinance that required "Communists and other subversives" to register with the police. He told the council he believed he was "signing a political death warrant" with his vote, adding that the law "places every citizen and organization . . . at the mercy of any biased crackpot who may decide to report the matter to the Police Department as subversive."

Juveniles, 1950. The council adopted a motion by Don A. Allen asking the Police Department what was being done to enforce curfew laws. Allen said it was his opinion that if policemen were "equipped with a good old-fashioned hair brush, which could be applied to some of these kids," there might be a lessening of juvenile crime. But Roybal disagreed, noting that most of the "hoodlums" were over 21 and recommending closer cooperation by the police with agencies "dealing with youth problems."

Rabies, 1953. He and his public health and welfare committee supported proposed legislation requiring all dogs to be vaccinated against rabies.

Dodgers, 1957. Roybal was opposed to the use of Chavez Ravine as a Major League Baseball stadium, claiming that "Chavez Ravine is the worst place in the world for a baseball park." He favored Wrigley Field.

Employment, 1958. He voted in favor of establishing a Fair Employment Practices Commission for the city. The bid lost on a 7–7 tie vote.

Bunker Hill, 1959. Roybal threatened a filibuster when the council would not accede to a request he made for monthly reports on the fate of residents evicted from Bunker Hill to make room for a massive improvement project.

Apology, 1960. Before and during a City Council meeting, he demanded an apology from Police Chief William H. Parker for Parker's having condemned some Latino residents of East Los Angeles as "not too far removed from the wild tribes of the inner mountains of Mexico. I don't think you can throw the genes out of the question when you discuss the behavior patterns of people." Parker made the statement at a hearing  before the U.S. Commission on Civil Rights; he refused to apologize but said that the word "wild" was ill-advised.

Statewide
During his time in the City Council, Roybal, as a prominent young Democrat, received encouragement to run for higher office. In 1954, he ran for lieutenant governor, losing to Republican incumbent Harold J. Powers, who had been appointed to the position after Lieutenant Governor Goodwin Knight acceded to the governorship after Earl Warren was named Chief Justice of the United States, by 1,764,035 votes (44.66%) to 2,185,918 (55.34%).

Running in 1958 against Ernest E. Debs for a seat on the Los Angeles County Board of Supervisors, Roybal lost a bitterly contested election in which he held a slim lead on election night, but lost after four recounts gave the election to Debs.

U.S. Congress

Despite this, Roybal ran for Congress in 1962, winning election in the 25th District, an area that included his native Boyle Heights, the larger East Los Angeles area, Downtown, and parts of Hollywood. Beginning his term in 1963, he became the first Latino Congressperson from California since the 1879 election of Romualdo Pacheco.

As Congressman, Roybal was generally known for a low-key legislative style. In his first term, he served on the Interior and Insular Affairs Committee and the Post Office Committee. In his next term, he served on the Foreign Affairs Committee and on the Veteran's Affairs Committee.

Beginning in 1971, he served on the House Appropriations Committee for more than two decades and authored a number of bills, many of which were not universally popular, which offered support for groups he saw as disenfranchised; many of his actions were on behalf of veterans, the elderly, and Mexican-Americans. In 1967 he wrote the first bill giving federal support to bilingual education, creating specialized language instruction for immigrant populations. As Chairman of the House Select Committee on Aging, he led a successful campaign to restore $15 million in funding the low-cost health programs for senior citizens and an expanded public housing program for seniors. In 1982 he worked to preserve the Meals on Wheels program and veterans' preferences in hiring. In the early 1980s, against the wishes of many of his own constituents, he argued for expanded funding for AIDS research.

In 1976 he became a founder of the Congressional Hispanic Caucus (CHC) and later co-founded the National Association of Latino Elected and Appointed Officials. In 1986, as chair of the Congressional Hispanic Caucus, he led the unsuccessful opposition to the Simpson-Mazzoli Act.

Koreagate
In 1978, Roybal was involved in a vote-buying investigation known as the Koreagate scandal, in which he failed to properly report to the House Ethics Committee a gift of $1000 from a South Korean lobbyist, Tongsun Park. During the investigation by the Ethics Committee, Roybal mistakenly stated he had never met Park.  Park later testified that he had met Roybal four years earlier, for less than two minutes, and that he hardly remembered the man. In addition, Roybal voted against every bill that would have benefitted Park, thus discrediting allegations of a vote buying scheme.

Requests by Hispanic leaders, and testimony by Representatives Ronald Dellums and Phillip Burton as to the facts of the case, as well as many representatives who spoke against the Ethics Committee recommendation for censure, resulted in the potential censure being reduced to a reprimand (the same punishment given the other two Representatives involved). In a letter dated November 29, 1978, Thomas H. Henderson, Jr., Chief of the Public Integrity Section, stated that "The House Committee found that this change of testimony and other facts testified to on April 25, 1978, concerning the incident was not intentionally untruthful as originally charged."  Undeterred, Roybal ran for reelection the same year and won 70% of the vote.

Roybal retired in 1993 after thirty years in office. That year, following redistricting, his daughter Lucille Roybal-Allard became the Representative for the 33rd District, which contained part of Roybal's district, while Xavier Becerra, with Roybal's endorsement, won election in 30th District, which included much of the remaining territory of Roybal's former 25th District.

Legacy

At the time of his death, more buildings in Los Angeles were named after him than any other single person. Among the buildings named for Roybal are the Edward R. Roybal Federal Building, located in what had been his home district in California, and the main campus of the Centers for Disease Control and Prevention in Atlanta, Georgia. The University of Southern California is home to the Edward R. Roybal Institute on Aging.

On March 25, 2008, the Los Angeles Unified School District Board of Education voted to name Central Los Angeles High School #11 (formerly Belmont Learning Center) as Edward R. Roybal Learning Center. The school opened on September 3, 2008.

In August 2022, the Roybal School of Film and Television Production Magnet opened, housed within the Edward R. Roybal Learning Center, aiming to provide a conduit for students from underrepresented backgrounds to gain below-the-line employment in the film and television sector, in fields such as lighting, cinematography and editing. The school arose from an initiative by George Clooney and Grant Heslov.

Every February, on or near Roybal's birthday, the National Association of Latino Elected and Appointed Officials (NALEO) hosts the Edward R. Roybal Legacy Gala  in Washington, D.C., as a tribute to the contributions he made to the nation, to NALEO and to the NALEO Educational Fund, of which he was the Founder Emeritus.

The Metro Gold Line Edward R. Roybal Linea de Oro Eastside Extension opened in November 2009. It runs through East Los Angeles from Union Station to Atlantic.

He was awarded a posthumous Presidential Medal of Freedom by President Barack Obama on November 24, 2014.

See also
List of federal political scandals in the United States
List of Hispanic and Latino Americans in the United States Congress
List of United States representatives expelled, censured, or reprimanded

References

Other references
  National Association of Latino Elected and Appointed Officials (NALEO) Educational Fund
  John P. Schmal, "Fracturing the Chicano Vote in California," LatinoLA, July 20, 2005, citing (1) Mexican American Legal Defense and Educational Fund and William C. Velasquez Institute, "California Congressional Redistricting Plan," at http://www.maldef.org/publications/pdf/Congressional_Plan_Supplement.pdf, (2) Richard Santillan, "California Reapportionment and the Chicano Community: An Historical Overview 1960-1980," in The Chicano Community and California Redistricting, Vol. I, Rose Institute of State and Local Government, Claremont Men's College, 1981, (3) Richard Santillan,Chicano Politics: La Raza Unida (Los Angeles: Tlaquilo Publications, 1973), p. 11, and (4) Katherine Underwood "Pioneering Minority Representation: Edward Roybal and the Los Angeles City Council, 1949-1962," Pacific Historical Review, 1997.
  John P. Schmal, "Edward Roybal Was a Pioneer," LatinoLA, October 27, 2005, citing (1) Alford, Harold. "The Proud Peoples." New York: David McKay Co., 1972, (2) Diaz, Katherine A., "Congressman Edward Roybal: Los Angeles Before the 1960s," Caminos 4:7 (July–August 1983), (3) Underwood, Katherine. "Pioneering Minority Representation: Edward Roybal and the Los Angeles City Council, 1949-1962." Pacific Historical Review 66:3 (August 1997): 399–425, and (4) Library of Congress, "Hispanic Americans in Congress, 1822-1995: Edward R. Roybal," Online: https://www.loc.gov/rr/hispanic/congress/roybal.html

External links
|
The Edward R. Roybal Legacy Gala NALEO

Further reading

 Burt, Kenneth C.  The Search for a Civic Voice: California Latino Politics.  Claremont, CA: Regina Books, 2007.  

 Sanchez, George J., "Edward R. Roybal and the Politics of Multiracialism," Southern California Quarterly, 92 (Spring 2010), 51–73.

|-

|-

|-

|-

1916 births
2005 deaths
20th-century American politicians
American politicians of Mexican descent
Censured or reprimanded members of the United States House of Representatives
Civilian Conservation Corps people
Deaths from pneumonia in California
Deaths from respiratory failure
Democratic Party members of the United States House of Representatives from California
Hispanic and Latino American members of the United States Congress
Los Angeles City Council members
Neomexicanos
People from Boyle Heights, Los Angeles
People from San Miguel County, New Mexico
California
Mexican
Mexican-American culture in California
Presidential Citizens Medal recipients
Presidential Medal of Freedom recipients
Southwestern Law School alumni
Ohtli Award winners